Nicholas Lalonde Bellore (born May 12, 1989) is an American football linebacker and fullback for the Seattle Seahawks of the National Football League (NFL). He played college football at Central Michigan, and signed with the New York Jets as an undrafted free agent in 2011. Bellore played linebacker for his first six seasons in the NFL before being converted to a fullback for the Detroit Lions in 2017.

Early years
Bellore was born in St. Paul, Minnesota, and attended Whitefish Bay High School, graduating in 2007. He chose to attend Central Michigan for a chance to start at linebacker immediately, despite interest from the University of Wisconsin and Kansas State University.

College career
At CMU, Bellore started at inside linebacker his freshman year and through his senior season. Bellore holds the second highest consecutive start streak at CMU with 51 games. He was an All-MAC First-team selection on defense in 2008, 2009 and 2010. The Chippewas appeared in three bowl games during Bellore's career, winning one (the 2010 GMAC Bowl), only the second bowl win in CMU history. He was also selected as CMU's Defensive Player of the Year in 2008 and 2009.

Professional career

New York Jets
After going undrafted in the 2011 NFL Draft, Bellore drew interest as an undrafted free agent from over half of the teams in the NFL. He signed with the Jets on July 26, 2011, and was kept on the roster to start the 2011 NFL season. He recorded 19 tackles in the 2011 season mainly on special teams.  On October 14, 2012, Bellore caught his first career pass on a fake punt by Tim Tebow.  He gained 23 yards on the play. Jets coaches looked into converting him to play fullback in training camp of 2012, but the experiment was short lived and he returned to linebacker. On January 6, 2015, Bellore was named to the 2014 Pro Football Focus All-Pro Special Teams.

San Francisco 49ers

Bellore signed a two-year contract with the San Francisco 49ers on April 3, 2015.

In 2016, Bellore appeared in 14 games where he started a career-high 10 games and registered 82 tackles, four passes defensed and the first sack, interception and fumble recovery of his career. He was placed on injured reserve on December 19, 2016 with an elbow injury.

Detroit Lions
On April 3, 2017, Bellore signed with the Detroit Lions. He was released on September 9, 2017, but was re-signed two days later. Bellore began being implemented in the Detroit offense as a fullback, strictly for blocking purposes until a surprise touchdown reception against the Baltimore Ravens on December 3, 2017. It was his first touchdown in his entire playing career.

On March 14, 2018, Bellore re-signed with the Lions.

Seattle Seahawks
On May 9, 2019, Bellore signed with the Seattle Seahawks. He finished the 2019 season with two receptions for 23 yards, including a three-yard touchdown reception in a Week 16 loss against the Arizona Cardinals.

Bellore was released during final roster cuts on September 5, 2020, but re-signed with the team two days later.

On March 18, 2021, Bellore signed a two-year deal worth $4.4 million, including $1.2 million guaranteed, to remain in Seattle.

On February 22, 2023, Bellore signed a two-year contract extension with the Seahawks.

References

External links
Seattle Seahawks bio
New York Jets bio
Central Michigan Chippewas bio

1989 births
Living people
Players of American football from Saint Paul, Minnesota
Players of American football from Wisconsin
American football linebackers
Central Michigan Chippewas football players
New York Jets players
San Francisco 49ers players
Detroit Lions players
Seattle Seahawks players
Whitefish Bay High School alumni
National Conference Pro Bowl players